Discipline: Heal Thyself, Pt. II is an album by Canadian musician Steven Page, released on 14 September 2018. It is Page's fifth full-length release outside of Barenaked Ladies and is a follow-up to the 2016 release, Heal Thyself Pt. 1: Instinct. The video for the song "White Noise," an explicit and political commentary on the Unite the Right rally that occurred in Charlottesville, Virginia on 11–12 August 2017, premiered on 2 August 2018.

Track listing

References

2018 albums
Steven Page albums
Albums produced by Craig Northey
Albums produced by Steven Page